Wanna Know may refer to:

"Wanna Know", a song from the album Second Round's on Me by Obie Trice
"Wanna Know", a song by UK rapper Dave remixed by Drake in 2016
"Wanna Know" (Meek Mill song)